Ball Square is a neighborhood primarily in Somerville, Massachusetts, but also extending into Medford, at the intersection of Boston Avenue and Broadway, located between Powder House Square and Magoun Square. It is primarily a residential area with a handful of shops and restaurants along Broadway.  Located on the edge of the neighborhood surrounding Tufts University, Ball Square contains a mix of businesses serving the student and academic populations as well as those reflecting the more blue-collar neighborhoods to the east.  These establishments include Kelly's Diner, Sound Bites, and Ball Square Cafe, all popular for breakfast; True Grounds, a coffee shop; Taco Party, Lyndell's Bakery; House of Kebab, an Indian restaurant; and Avenue Kitchen and Bar.

The Brown School, opened in 1900, is located on Willow Avenue and serves the neighborhood's children from kindergarten to fifth grade.  It is the only K-5 school in the Somerville School District.

Ball Square station on the MBTA Green Line is located adjacent to the square.

History 
Ball Square was named for John Nichols Ball (1835–1901).  Following in the path of his uncle, Ball opened an insole factory in 1883 at 686 Broadway, between Josephine and Rogers Avenues.  A respected business man Ball took up politics in 1895. That year, he began his term as a member of Somerville's Common Council. In 1897 he was elected to the Somerville Board of Aldermen and by the next year served as board president. Ball was discussed as a potential Republican candidate for mayor. Instead, he chose to enter state politics, running successfully as Representative for the 7th Middlesex District in 1900. Ball was well liked enough in his first term that he was reelected to the House in 1901. His burgeoning political career was cut short, however, by his death that October at age 66 

Ball Square was formerly the site of the storied Willow Jazz Club. In the 1990s, a fire destroyed several commercial businesses on Broadway, and as those businesses were replaced, an economic transformation began that continues today, with long-time businesses such as Lyndell's Bakery, which dates to the 19th century, along the same stretch as Ball Square Fine Wines and Liquor, a high-end wine shop, KenkoDo Clinic, an Acupuncture and wellness clinic, Amal Niccoli Salon, Salon Cu and Lindsay Griffin, hair salons to name a few of many businesses.

The Medford Branch of the Green Line Extension opened on December 12, 2022, with Ball Square station one of five new stations.

References

External links
 A guide to bars, restaurants, and shops in Ball Square at ballsquaresomerville.com

Neighborhoods in Somerville, Massachusetts
Squares in Somerville, Massachusetts
Tourist attractions in Middlesex County, Massachusetts